The men's football tournament at the 2020 Summer Olympics was held from 22 July to 7 August 2021. Originally, it was to be held from 23 July to 8 August 2020, but the Summer Olympics were postponed to the following year due to the COVID-19 pandemic. However, the official name of the games remains the 2020 Summer Olympics. It was the 27th edition of the men's Olympic football tournament. Together with the women's competition, the 2020 Summer Olympics football tournament was held at six stadiums in six cities in Japan. The final was hosted at the International Stadium in Yokohama. Teams participating in the men's competition were restricted to under-24 players (born on or after 1 January 1997) with a maximum of three overage players allowed. The men's tournament is typically restricted to under-23 players though following the postponement of the Olympics by a year, FIFA decided to maintain the restriction of players born on or after 1 January 1997.

Brazil were the defending champions and successfully retained their title.

Schedule
The match schedule of the tournament as of 5 December 2018.

Qualification

In addition to host nation Japan, 15 men's national teams will qualify from six separate continental confederations. The Organising Committee for FIFA Competitions ratified the distribution of spots at their meeting on 14 September 2017.

Venues

The tournament was held in six venues across six cities:
Kashima Stadium, Kashima
Miyagi Stadium, Rifu
Saitama Stadium 2002, Saitama
Sapporo Dome, Sapporo
Tokyo Stadium, Chōfu
International Stadium Yokohama, Yokohama

Due to the COVID-19 pandemic in Japan, most matches were played behind closed doors without any spectators. However, Miyagi Stadium allowed a limited audience to attend matches and Kashima Stadium permitted local schoolchildren as part of the school program but Olympic spectators were still not allowed.

Squads

The men's tournament was an international tournament with restrictions on age: players had to be born on or after 1 January 1997, with three overage players allowed for each squad in the final tournament. Traditionally the roster rules required each team to submit a squad of 18 players, two of whom must be goalkeepers. Each team also named a list of four alternate players, who could replace any player in the squad in case of injury during the tournament. In late June 2021 the International Olympic Committee and FIFA announced that all 22 players of each team would be available for selection before each match. Prior to each match, the teams chose from their total of 22 players, a roster of 18 players to be available for play in that match. The rule change was made in regards to the challenges presented by the COVID-19 pandemic.

Match officials
In June 2020, FIFA approved the use of the video assistant referee (VAR) system for the tournament. The match officials were announced on 23 April 2021.

Draw
The draw for the tournament was held on 21 April 2021, 10:00 CEST (UTC+2), at the FIFA headquarters in Zürich, Switzerland. It was conducted by Sarai Bareman, FIFA chief women's football officer, while Samantha Johnson presented the ceremony. Lindsay Tarpley and Ryan Nelsen acted as the draw assistants.

The sixteen teams were drawn into four groups of four teams. The hosts Japan were automatically seeded into Pot 1 and assigned to position A1, while the remaining teams were seeded into their respective pots based on their results in the last five Olympics (more recent tournaments weighted more heavily), with bonus points awarded to confederation champions. No group could contain more than one team from each confederation.

Group stage
The competing countries were divided into four groups of four teams, denoted as groups A, B, C and D. Teams in each group played one another in a round-robin basis with the top two teams of each group advancing to the quarter-finals.

All times are local, JST (UTC+9).

Tiebreakers
The ranking of teams in the group stage was determined as follows:

 Points obtained in all group matches (three points for a win, one for a draw, none for a defeat);
 Goal difference in all group matches;
 Number of goals scored in all group matches;
 Points obtained in the matches played between the teams in question;
 Goal difference in the matches played between the teams in question;
 Number of goals scored in the matches played between the teams in question;
 Fair play points in all group matches (only one deduction could be applied to a player in a single match): 
 Drawing of lots.

Group A

Group B

Group C

Group D

Knockout stage

In the knockout stage, if a match was level at the end of normal playing time, extra time was played (two periods of 15 minutes each) and followed, if necessary, by a penalty shoot-out to determine the winner.

Bracket

Quarter-finals

Semi-finals

Bronze medal match

Gold medal match

Statistics

Goalscorers

Final ranking

Notes

References

External links
Men's Olympic Football Tournament Tokyo 2020, FIFA.com

 
Men
Men's events at the 2020 Summer Olympics